The HPD ARX-04b is an LMP2 race car designed and built by Wirth Research for Honda Performance Development. The car was designed as the successor to the HPD ARX-03 series of Le Mans Prototypes, however the poor performance of the car meant that the older model outlived the ARX-04b, and the 04b only contested one race, the 2015 24 Hours of Daytona.

Racing history

The car was designed to meet the new set of LMP2 regulations, starting in 2014. Two cars were delivered to its sole customer, Extreme Speed Motorsports, in December 2014, where it soon began testing. The team intended to use the cars in the 2015 United SportsCar Championship, starting at the 24 Hours of Daytona. The cars were uncompetitive during the race, and both cars failed to reach the finish. The #1 car managed to complete 389 laps to the winners 740, but the #2 car managed only 50.

Following the disappointment of Daytona, Extreme Speed Motorsport decided to take time to test the car further, opting to race the older HPD ARX-03b at Sebring. The team remained unsatisfied with the car, and chose to replace them with the Ligier JS P2. Daytona remains the only race outing of the ARX-04. HPD continued to test and develop the car, to try and resolve aerodynamic problems and improve its performance.

The ARX-04 was also entered into the 2015 Pikes Peak International Hillclimb, with Justin Wilson assigned to drive the car. However, reliability issues meant that the car was unable to drive in the event.

In 2016, a revised version of the ARX-04b was tested by Michael Shank Racing. Shank later praised the improvements that the car has made. The car was later used by Shank to test the 2017 Continental tyres for the upcoming season

References

Le Mans Prototypes
Racing cars